Krzysztof Cegielski (born 3 September 1979 in Poland) is a former Polish speedway rider who was a permanent Speedway Grand Prix rider in 2002 and 2003 season.

In 2003 he was involved in an on-track crash in a Swedish League. The resulting spinal cord injury left him partially paralysed, and ended his racing career. He has remained close to the speedway world, acting as a speedway manager and expert. After over a decade of determined and laborious rehabilitation, he managed to get back on his feet, and is now able to walk short distances.

Speedway Grand Prix results

Career

Individual World Championship (Speedway Grand Prix)
2001 - 30th place (5 points)
2002 - 16th place (55 points)
2003 - 24th place (16 points)

Individual U-21 World Championship
1997 - Lost in National Qualification - Semi-Final
1998 - Lost in National Qualification - Semi-Final
1999 - Lost in National Qualification - Final
2000 - 2nd place (11 points +3)

Team World Championship (Speedway World Cup)
2001 - 2nd place (11 points)
2002 - 4th place (9 points)

Individual European Championship
2001 - 3rd place (12 points)

Individual U-19 European Championship
1998 - 4th place (12 points +2)

Individual Polish Championship
2001 - 4th place (11 points)
2002 - 2nd place (10 points)

Individual U-21 Polish Championship
1998 - 9th place (9 points)
1999 - 2nd place (13 points +F)
2000 - 5th place (11 points)

Polish Pairs Championship
1998 - Polish Champion
2000 - 2nd place

Polish U-21 Pairs Championship
1999 - 2nd place
2000 - 2nd place

Team U-21 Polish Championship
1999 - Polish Champion with Stal Gorzów in Piła

Golden Helmet
2001 - 7th place (7 points)

Silver Helmet (U-21)
1998 - 2nd place (13 points)
1999 - 9th place (7 points)
2000 - 8th place (7 points)

Bronze Helmet (U-19)
1997 - 5th place (9 points)
1998 - 2nd place (13 points)

See also
List of Speedway Grand Prix riders
Poland speedway team

External links
Photo

1979 births
Living people
21st-century Polish journalists
Eastbourne Eagles riders
Polish speedway riders
Poole Pirates riders
Sportspeople from Gorzów Wielkopolski